Eulaulah Donyll "Lalah" Hathaway (born December 16, 1968) is an American singer. 
In 1990 Hathaway released her first album titled Lalah Hathaway. After releasing another album, titled A Moment (1994), it debuted at number 34 on the Top R&B albums chart. In 1999 she collaborated with Joe Sample on the album The Song Lives On. After a five-year hiatus, she returned with her fourth album, Outrun the Sky (2004). The single "Forever, For Always, For Love" peaked at number 1 on the Hot Adult R&B Airplay.

Stax Records released her fifth album Self Portrait in 2008. It debuted at number 63 on the Billboard 200 and reached the top 10 on the Top R&B albums chart, making this album her most successful album to date. She is the daughter of American soul singer and musician Donny Hathaway. According to her website in March 2020 Hathaway is working on a studio album entitled, L.A.L.A.H. Rebirth. Hathaway received an honorary doctorate from Berklee College of Music in 2022.

Recording career 
In 1990 Hathaway released her self-titled first album, which she recorded while still a student at Berklee College of Music. The album debuted at number 191 on the Billboard Hot 200 and number 18 on the Top R&B/Hip-Hop Albums chart.

In July 1991, a version of Sly Stone's "Family Affair" was released by a Heaven 17 side-project called the BEF (British Electric Foundation) which featured Lalah Hathaway on vocals. This cover would reach number 37 on the Gallup/Top of The Pops/UK Singles Chart Top 40, the only record by the BEF to do so (away from regular Heaven 17 releases).

In 1992, Hathaway sang lead vocals on the single Love Like This released by Grover Washington Jr. from his Next Exit album. 

In 1994, A Moment debuted at number 34 on the Top R&B albums chart and number 23 on the Heatseekers chart.

She worked with established musicians such as Mary J. Blige, Marcus Miller, Take 6, and The Winans, writing, producing, and singing background vocals. In 1999, she joined GRP and collaborated with Joe Sample on The Song Lives On, which reached No. 2 on the jazz album chart. It became her second debut on the Billboard Hot 200 and later charted on Top R&B album chart.

In 2004, she released a cover version of Luther Vandross's song "Forever, for Always, for Love". The song appeared on the all-star tribute album Forever, for Always, for Luther and on her fourth album Outrun the Sky. It reached number 1 on the Adult R&B chart. "Forever, for Always, for Love" became her first single to chart on the Billboard Hot 100, charting at number 112 and number 37 on the Hot R&B. Her first solo album in five years was produced by Rex Rideout, Mike City, and Chris Parks.

Hathaway was featured on Donald Lawrence's debut solo album I Speak Life as a lead vocalist on "Don't Forget to Remember". In 2005, she was seen on the international Daughters of Soul tour with Sandra St. Victor, Nona Hendryx, Simone, and Joyce Kennedy.

After Stax signed Hathaway she stated, "The foundation of soul music is rooted in Stax Records. Working with Maurice White on the Interpretations project was more than special to me. There is no higher compliment than to be signed to a label whose music is timeless. I'm proud to carry the torch that will continue to bring quality soul music to a new audience."

Her first single was "Love's Holiday" from the Earth, Wind & Fire tribute album Interpretations. In April 2008, Stax released "Let Go", which debuted at number 51 on the Hot R&B chart and number 16 on the Hot Adult R&B. In June 2008, Self Portrait was released. Collaborating again with producer Rex Rideout and working with Rahsaan Patterson and Sandra St. Victor, Self Portrait became her most successful album to date, debuting at number 6 on the Top R&B/Hip-Hop Albums chart and number 63 on the Hot 200.

After the release of Self Portrait, Hathaway went on tour beginning in July 2008. The Self Portrait Tour contained 10 tour dates in America and a collection of songs from her previous albums, Lalah Hathaway and Outrun the Sky and a few songs from Self Portrait. The tour only reached America. In late 2008, "That Was Then" was released as the album's second single. The single debuted at number 105 on the Hot R&B chart and number 32 on the Hot Adult R&B Airplay.

In November 2008, Hathaway joined Will Downing and Gerald Albright for the Soulful Chr*stmas Tour in Washington, D.C., Memphis, Dallas, Houston, Indianapolis, Chicago, Detroit, Philadelphia, St. Louis, and Atlanta. In January 2009, she appeared on Black Entertainment Television in an interview and performed before an audience. She continued to support the album and was scheduled to perform at the Capital Jazz Festival in Columbia, Maryland, the Essence Music Festival in New Orleans, and Circle of Promise, which took place in July 2009. In December 2009 she won the Song of the Year award in the SoulTracks Readers' Choice Award for her duet with singer Eric Roberson on "Dealing".

Music and voice 

During the recording process of her fifth studio album she stated, "I don't necessarily want to fit into what's happening now, but I want to stand with it, doing my own thing. I would really love it if people need the record. I put a lot of myself into this album, so I hope people can hear me and understand who I am."

Although she has created a space for herself, Hathaway remains connected to her late father and his classic sound. She has stated, "I am his daughter and that's the truth of who I am, every day. When I was 15, and then, 20, I didn't get why people were asking me how I felt about him and his music. But when I turned 25, I began to understand. Like my father, I want to leave a legacy of music that makes people really feel something, whether it be happiness, sadness, grief or heartache. I also want them to appreciate my humor which I know can be difficult to interpret in a song."

Hathaway masters a rare type of multiphonic ("overtone") singing which allows her to "split" her voice and sing several notes at the same time. Hathaway earned her first career GRAMMY for 2013 for Best R&B Performance for "Something" with Snarky Puppy, where she displayed this ability.

Songwriting and producing 
Between album projects, Hathaway, who has recorded collaborations with Marcus Miller, Meshell Ndegeocello, and Mary J. Blige, keeps her creativity nourished by contributing her voice to Daughters of Soul Tour, a musical mélange founded by Sandra St. Victor and featuring Nona Hendryx, Joyce Kennedy, as well as Indira and Simone, daughters of Chaka Khan and Nina Simone.

Although it might seem that "On Your Own" from Self Portrait, which reunites her with Rex Rideout and Rahsaan Patterson, is inspired by a past heartbreak, the idea for the song came to her in a dream. While Hathaway is often known for singing down tempo songs, during the period of 2004 and 2008, she had done mid-tempo songs such as "Let Go", "Let Me Love You", and "Better and Better". Keeping with the theme of her family, she often journeys back to her childhood with "Little Girl", which she co-produced with Rex Rideout, Rahsaan Patterson, and Sandra St. Victor.

Stage 
On stage, Hathaway often performs songs longer than their album equivalents, with many exceeding the five-minute mark and occasionally with new arrangements. Hathaway's band generally consists of a keyboardist, guitarist, bassist, and drummer. Hathaway's vocal prowess has led to audiences demanding her microphone be turned up in the mix during live performances. Dawn E. Robinson of VocalMusician.com stated in a review: "The sound in the house was strange – the band was really too loud all evening. Even when the sound guy turned Lalah's vocals up (at the audience's request), the band got louder. I got the impression that the sound onstage was good though, because none of the singers appeared to be over-singing."

Discography 

Studio and live albums
 Lalah Hathaway (1990)
 A Moment (1994)
 Outrun the Sky (2004)
 Self Portrait (2008)
 Where It All Begins (2011)
 Lalah Hathaway Live (2015)
 Honestly (2017)

Collaboration albums
 The Song Lives On (with Joe Sample) (1999)

References

External links 
Official site
Audio Interview from 2012 at Soulinterviews.com

1968 births
20th-century American women singers
21st-century American women singers
African-American Christians
20th-century African-American women singers
American contemporary R&B singers
American contraltos
American women jazz singers
American gospel singers
American jazz singers
Ballad musicians
Grammy Award winners
Living people
American neo soul singers
Singers from Chicago
Virgin Records artists
Jazz musicians from Illinois
20th-century American singers
21st-century American singers
Berklee College of Music alumni
21st-century African-American women singers